was the forty-second of the fifty-three stations (shukuba) of the Tōkaidō connecting Edo with Kyoto in Edo period Japan. It was  located in former Ise Province in what is now part of the city of Kuwana, Mie Prefecture, Japan.

History
Kuwana-juku was located in the castle town of Kuwana Domain, which was a major security barrier on the Tōkaidō for the Tokugawa shogunate. The post station was located on the western shores of the Ibi River. Between Kuwana and the next station to the west, Miya-juku, were the Kiso Three Rivers, which included the Nagara River and the Kiso River in addition to the Ibi River. As all three rivers were near their outlets to Ise Bay, their channels were wide, and the shogunate forbid the construction of any bridges, as this would facilitate the crossing of any army from the west across the rivers towards Edo. This posed a problem however for travelers. A large torii gate on the Kuwana side of the crossing indicated that this was also on the route for pilgrims to the Ise Grand Shrine. This route was roughly eight kilometers longer than the direct sea route, and was much more expensive in terms of tolls, but was also much quicker. This route was constructed by Owari Domain for the visit of Shogun Tokugawa Ieyasu to Kyoto, and was the route used two centuries later by Emperor Meiji when he first travelled from Kyoto to Tokyo. 

The popular local specialities of Kuwana-juku was grilled hamaguri clams, whitebait and banko ware pottery. Kuwana-juku was 376.9 kilometers from Edo.

During the Edo period, Kuwana was directly on the shores of the river, but after the Kansai Railroad built Kuwana Station, the city center was shifted further to the west.

Kuwana-juku in The Fifty-three Stations of the Tōkaidō
Utagawa Hiroshige's ukiyo-e Hōeidō edition print of Kuwana-juku dates from 1833 -1834. The print depicts the two large ships of the Shichiri no watashi ferries preparing to depart with travelers from in front of Kuwana Castle, with other ships sailing away in the background.

Neighboring post towns
Tōkaidō
Miya-juku - Kuwana-juku - Yokkaichi-juku
Saya Kaidō
Saya-juku - Kuwana-juku (ending location)

References

Further reading

Carey, Patrick. Rediscovering the Old Tokaido:In the Footsteps of Hiroshige. Global Books UK (2000). 
Chiba, Reiko. Hiroshige's Tokaido in Prints and Poetry. Tuttle. (1982) 
Taganau, Jilly. The Tokaido Road: Travelling and Representation in Edo and Meiji Japan. RoutledgeCurzon (2004).

External links

THE WOODBLOCK PRINTS OF UTAGAWA HIROSHIGE The Great Tōkaidō
Official home page 
 Mie Prefecture Tourist Association home page 

Stations of the Tōkaidō
Stations of the Tōkaidō in Mie Prefecture
Ise Province
Kuwana, Mie